Polk Township is an inactive township in Cass County, in the U.S. state of Missouri.

Polk Township was established in 1872, taking its name from President James K. Polk.

References

Townships in Missouri
Townships in Cass County, Missouri